The Beauharnois generating station is a run-of-the-river hydroelectric power station along the Saint Lawrence Seaway on the Saint Lawrence River, in Quebec, Canada. Constructions on the facility began in 1930 and was completed in 1961.

The facility was designated a National Historic Site of Canada in 1990.

See also 

 List of largest power stations in Canada
 Reservoirs and dams in Canada
 Beauharnois scandal
 Beauharnois Canal
 Saint Lawrence Seaway

References 

Energy infrastructure completed in 1961
Hydroelectric power stations in Quebec
Hydro-Québec
Run-of-the-river power stations
Buildings and structures in Montérégie
Beauharnois-Salaberry Regional County Municipality
Saint Lawrence River